This is a list of mayors of the Wil, Canton of St. Gallen, Switzerland. The mayor of Wil (Stadtpräsident, earlier: Stadtammann) chairs the five-member city council (Stadtrat).

References 

Wil
Wil